Esymus merdarius is a species of scarab beetle found in the Palearctic. The species was formerly a member of the genus Aphodius.

References

Scarabaeidae
Beetles described in 1775
Beetles of Europe
Taxa named by Johan Christian Fabricius